Do Boneh (also Romanized as Dowbeneh; also known as Dārū Boneh and Dāvar Boneh) is a village in Eslamabad Rural District, in the Central District of Jiroft County, Kerman Province, Iran. At the 2006 census, its population was 1,732, in 334 families.

References 

Populated places in Jiroft County